Events from the year 1432 in France

Incumbents
 Monarch – Charles VII

Events
 6 January – The siege of Pouancé begins during the Hundred Years' War
 Unknown – The University of Caen is founded in Normandy

Deaths
 Joan of Valois, Duchess of Alençon (born 1409)

References

1430s in France